Brumos may refer to:

Brumos Racing, an automobile racing team based in Jacksonville, Florida.
Brumos Porsche 250, also known as the Paul Revere 250, was a 250-mile sports car support race held on the road course at Daytona International Speedway